Frederick William Dyke (December 27, 1922 – June 28, 2012) was a Canadian curler from Nova Scotia. He played as second on the 1951 Brier Champion team, skipped by Don Oyler.

References

Brier champions
Canadian military personnel of World War II
1922 births
2012 deaths
Curlers from Nova Scotia
People from Kings County, Nova Scotia
People from Yarmouth, Nova Scotia
Canadian male curlers